Magda Andersson (born 14 July 1998) is a Swedish former racing driver. She formerly competed in the FIA European Rallycross Championship before financially sacrificing her career for her sister Klara's.

Results

Complete FIA European Rallycross Championship results

TouringCar

Supercar

References

External links
 

Living people
1998 births
Swedish racing drivers
Swedish female racing drivers
European Rallycross Championship drivers
Sportspeople from Skåne County